"She Got the Best of Me" is a song by American country music singer Luke Combs. He wrote the song with Rob Snyder and Channing Wilson. It is the fourth single from his debut album This One's for You, to which it was added as a bonus track.

Content
The song is a "soaring power ballad" in which the narrator says that a former lover "got the best of [him]" because he is unable to stop thinking of her. Combs said that he wrote the song four years prior to its recording, at a bar in Nashville, Tennessee called the Tin Roof. It was added to Combs's debut album This One's for You as a bonus track due to fan demand.

"She Got the Best of Me" is composed in the key of B major with a main chord pattern of E–B–Gm–F. The song has a moderate tempo in cut time.

Chart performance
"She Got the Best of Me" reached number one on the Billboard Country Airplay chart dated October 27, 2018, becoming Combs' fourth consecutive number one single, and making him the first solo artist to send all of his or her first four singles to number one since the inception of Nielsen SoundScan in January 1990, and the third act to do so overall, behind Brooks & Dunn and Florida Georgia Line. The song was certified Platinum on January 17, 2019 by the RIAA. It has sold 421,000 copies in the United States as of July 2019.

Music video
The music video was created by TA Films. The song contains references to previous videos of Combs's, including characters from the videos to "Hurricane" and "One Number Away", and visual references to other songs from Combs's album.

Charts

Weekly charts

Year-end charts

Certifications

References

2010s ballads
2018 songs
2018 singles
Country ballads
Luke Combs songs
Songs written by Luke Combs
Columbia Nashville Records singles